Dotta callicles, the pale ranger, is a species of butterfly in the family Hesperiidae. It is found in South Africa (KwaZulu-Natal, Transvaal), Eswatini, Mozambique and Zimbabwe.

The wingspan is 27–29 mm for males and 31–33 mm for females. Adults are on wing from November to April (with a peak from February to March). There is one extended generation per year.

The larvae feed on Imperata cylindrica.

References

Butterflies described in 1868
Butterflies of Africa
Taxa named by William Chapman Hewitson